Steatoda borealis is a species of cobweb spider in the family Theridiidae. It is found in the United States and Canada.

References

Further reading

 

Steatoda
Articles created by Qbugbot
Spiders described in 1850